The 2001/02 NTFL season was the 81st season of the Northern Territory Football League (NTFL).

Palmerston have won their third premiership title while defeating the Nightcliff Tigers in the grand final by 58 points.

Grand Final

References

Northern Territory Football League seasons
NTFL